A race car log book is a document certifying that a car is prepared to a given set of rules and is safe for competition (usually concerned with roll cage construction).  Log books are usually issued by a certified technical inspector for a motorsports sanctioning body.  All competitions entered as well as the condition of the car before and after each competition must be entered in this book.  Using log books is required by most sanctioning bodies for most upper levels of motorsports.

Auto racing equipment